Juan Ruiz de Medina (died 30 January 1507) was a Roman Catholic prelate who served as Bishop of Segovia (1502–1507), Bishop of Cartagena (1495–1502), Bishop of Badajoz (1493–1495), and Bishop of Astorga (1489–1493).

Biography
In 1489, Juan Ruiz de Medina was selected by the King of Spain and confirmed by Pope Innocent VIII as Bishop of Astorga. On March 27, 1493, he was appointed by Pope Alexander VI as Bishop of Badajoz. On 20 February 1495, he was appointed by Pope Alexander VI as Bishop of Cartagena. In 1502, he was appointed by Pope Alexander VI as Bishop of Segovia. He served as Bishop of Segovia until his death on 30 January 1507.

References

External links and additional sources
 (for Chronology of Bishops) 
 (for Chronology of Bishops) 
 (for Chronology of Bishops) 
 (for Chronology of Bishops) 
 (for Chronology of Bishops) 
 (for Chronology of Bishops) 

1507 deaths
16th-century Roman Catholic bishops in Spain
Bishops appointed by Pope Innocent VIII
Bishops appointed by Pope Alexander VI
University of Salamanca alumni